The 1905–06 St Helens R.F.C. season was the club's eleventh in the Northern Rugby Football Union, the 32nd in their history. After finishing 12th in Division 1 the season previous, St Helens were expected to take part in Division 2 from 1905. However, the two divisions became one 31-team Championship, saving the club from relegation. They finished in a fairly respectable 14th. In the South West Lancashire League, St Helens finished fifth in a six-team league. In the Challenge Cup, the club did not even make the first round proper, as they were defeated by Rochdale in the Preliminary Round.

NRFU Championship

References

St Helens R.F.C. seasons
1905 in English rugby league
1906 in English rugby league